Memorial Sloan Kettering Cancer Center (MSK or MSKCC) is a cancer treatment and research institution in the borough of Manhattan in New York City, founded in 1884 as the New York Cancer Hospital. MSKCC is one of 52 National Cancer Institute–designated Comprehensive Cancer Centers. Its main campus is located at 1275 York Avenue, between 67th and 68th streets, in Manhattan.

According to U.S. News & World Report 2021-2022 Best Hospitals, Memorial Sloan Kettering Cancer Center (MSK) has been ranked as the number two hospital for cancer care in the nation.

History

New York Cancer Hospital (1884–1934)
Memorial Hospital was founded on the Upper West Side of Manhattan in 1884 as the New York Cancer Hospital by a group that included John Jacob Astor III and his wife Charlotte. The hospital appointed as an attending surgeon William B. Coley, who pioneered an early form of immunotherapy to eradicate tumors. Rose Hawthorne, daughter of author Nathaniel Hawthorne, trained there in the summer of 1896 before founding her own order, Dominican Sisters of Hawthorne. In 1899, the hospital was renamed General Memorial Hospital for the Treatment of Cancer and Allied Diseases. In 1902, Arabella Huntington made a $100,000 (approximately $3 million in 2018) bequest in memory of her late husband Collis Potter Huntington to establish the first cancer research fund in the country, the Huntington Fund for Cancer Research.

Around 1910 James Ewing, a professor at Cornell University's medical college,  established a collaboration with Memorial Hospital with the help and funding of industrialist and philanthropist James Douglas, who gave $100,000 to endow twenty beds for clinical research, equipment for working with radium, and a clinical laboratory for that purpose.  Douglas' enthusiasm and funding for development of radiation therapy for cancer inspired Ewing to become one of the pioneers in developing this treatment.  Ewing soon took over effective leadership of clinical and laboratory research at Memorial.  In 1916 the hospital was renamed again, dropping "General" to become known simply as Memorial Hospital. The first fellowship training program in the US was created at Memorial in 1927, funded by the Rockefellers. In 1931 the then-most-powerful 900k-volt X-ray tube was put into use in radiation-based cancer treatment at Memorial; the tube had been built by General Electric over several years.  In 1931 Ewing was formally appointed president of the hospital, a role he had effectively played until then, and was featured on the cover of Time magazine as "Cancer Man Ewing"; the accompanying article described his role as one of the most important cancer doctors of his era.  He worked at the Memorial until his retirement, in 1939. Under his leadership, Memorial became a model for other cancer centers in the United States, combining patient care with clinical and laboratory research, and it was said of him that "the relationship of Ewing to the Memorial Hospital can best be expressed in the words of Emerson, 'Every institution is but the lengthening shadow of some man.' Dr. Ewing is the Memorial Hospital".

Memorial Hospital and the Sloan Kettering Institute (1934–1980)
In 1934, John D. Rockefeller Jr. donated land on York Avenue for a new location. Two years later, he granted Memorial Hospital $3,000,000 and the hospital began their move across town. Memorial Hospital officially reopened at the new location in 1939.  In 1945, the chairman of General Motors, Alfred P. Sloan, donated $4,000,000 to create the Sloan-Kettering Institute for Cancer Research through his Sloan Foundation, and Charles F. Kettering, GM's vice president and director of research, personally agreed to oversee the organization of a cancer research program based on industrial techniques. The originally independent research institute was built adjacent to Memorial Hospital.

In 1948 Cornelius P. Rhoads became the director of Memorial. Rhoads had run chemical weapons programs for the US army in World War II, and had been involved in the work that led to the discovery that nitrogen mustards could potentially be used as cancer drugs.  He fostered a collaboration between Joseph H. Burchenal, a clinician at Memorial and Gertrude B. Elion and George H. Hitchings at Burroughs Wellcome, who had discovered 6 MP; the collaboration led to the development and eventual wide use of this cancer drug.

From the mid-1950s to the mid-1960s Chester M. Southam conducted pioneering clinical research on virotherapy and cancer immunotherapy at MSK; however he conducted his research on people without their informed consent. He did this to patients under his care or others' care, and to prisoners.  In 1963 some doctors objected to the lack of consent in his experiments and reported him to the Regents of the University of the State of New York which found him guilty of fraud, deceit, and unprofessional conduct, and in the end, he was placed on probation for a year. Southam's research experiments and the case at the Regents were followed in The New York Times.

In 1960, Memorial Sloan Kettering Cancer Center was formed as a new corporation to coordinate the two institutions; John Heller, the former director of the National Cancer Institute was named its president. At the end of the 1960s, as the field of pediatric oncology began seeing success in treating children with cancer, Memorial opened an outpatient pediatric day hospital, partly to deal with the growing number of cancer survivors.  In the early 1970s, Burchenal and Benno Schmidt, a professional investor and trustee of MSK, were appointed to the presidential panel that initiated the U.S. federal government's War on Cancer in the early 1970s.  When Congress passed the National Cancer Act of 1971 as part of that effort, Memorial Sloan Kettering was designated as one of only three Comprehensive Cancer Centers nationwide.  In 1977, Jimmie C. Holland established a full-time psychiatric service at MSK dedicated to helping people with cancer cope with their disease and its treatment; it was one of the first such programs and was part of the creation of the field of psycho-oncology.

Memorial Sloan Kettering Cancer Center (1980–present)
In 1980, Memorial Hospital and the Sloan-Kettering Institute formally merged into a singular entity under the name Memorial Sloan Kettering Cancer Center.

In 2000, former NIH director Harold Varmus became the director of MSK. During his tenure, he helped build new facilities, strengthened the bond between MSK's clinical and research arms, and fostered collaborations with other institutions, including Weill-Cornell Medical College and Rockefeller University.

In 2006, MSK opened the Mortimer B. Zuckerman Research Center, a 23-story building which houses more than 100 laboratories.

In 2010, Craig B. Thompson, oncologist and researcher, was appointed MSK's president and CEO. The following year, MSK was rated the third most successful nonprofit in terms of FDA-approved drugs and vaccines, behind the National Institutes of Health and the University of California system. In 2012, Thompson appointed José Baselga as physician-in-chief, who directed the clinical side of MSK. That same year, a collaboration with IBM's Watson was announced with the goal of developing new tools and resources to better tailor diagnostic and treatment recommendations for patients. The director of SKI, the research arm of MSK, Joan Massagué was appointed in 2013. Baselga resigned in September 2018 after information came out regarding millions of dollars he received from pharmaceutical companies without disclosing a financial conflict of interest.

In 2017, the Food and Drug Administration approved an MSK-developed immunotherapy, CAR-T, for certain applications in leukemia and lymphoma. The FDA approved the first academic or commercial tumor identification test MSK-IMPACT in November 2018.

MSK has expanded into regional sites including Westchester (NY), Commack (Long Island), Hauppauge (Long Island), Rockville Centre (Long Island), Nassau (Long Island), Bergen (NJ), Monmouth (NJ), and Basking Ridge (NJ).

MSK currently employs over 1,200 physicians and treats patients with approximately 400 types of cancer annually.

In April 2022, MSK announced a $50 million donation from The Starr Foundation to aid in expanding funding for basic cancer research and discovery science. The donation will establish The Starr Foundation programme for Discovery Science at the Sloan Kettering Institute, the goal of the institute is to drive next-generation cancer breakthroughs.
In June 2022 A small drug trial is having a seismic impact on the world of oncology: After six months of experimental treatment, tumors vanished in all 14 patients diagnosed with early stage rectal cancer who completed the study by the time it was published.

Associated facilities and programs

The Memorial Sloan Kettering Bendheim Integrative Medicine Center had occupied 1429 First Avenue on the corner of East 74th Street in Manhattan. The former bank was built in the 1930s by Perkins and Will as architects. It was remodeled for use by Memorial Sloan Kettering in 1997.

The Center for Image-Guided Intervention was opened in June 2010 in the Memorial Hospital building to oversee image guiding activities across MSK. In October 2012, the Sillerman Center for Rehabilitation was opened, moving rehabilitation out of Memorial Hospital and closer to the Rockefeller Outpatient Pavilion.

The New York Proton Center opened in 2019 as a partnership between Memorial Sloan Kettering, Montefiore Health, and Mount Sinai Health. The center was the first Proton therapy center to open in New York State. The David H. Koch Center for Cancer Care at Memorial Sloan Kettering Cancer Center opened at 530 East 74th Street between York Avenue and the FDR Drive January 2020. Perkins Eastman designed 750,000sq ft facility in collaboration with Ennead Architects, and ICRAVE. Thornton Tomasetti served as structural engineer, with Jaros, Baum & Bolles providing MEP engineering.

India Center
The center launched its India facility in Chennai in Aug 2022, to provide tele medicine services in collaboration with iCiliniq to facilitate second opinion from the cancer specialists, without the need to travel to US facility.

Training 
Approximately 1,700 medical residents and Fellows are in training at MSK. There are 575 postdoctoral researchers training at MSK labs and a combined 288 PhD and MD-PhD candidates.

In 2004, the Louis V. Gerstner, Jr. Graduate School of Biomedical Sciences was opened at Memorial Sloan Kettering Cancer Center. The first students graduated in 2012. As of January 2019, the dean of the graduate school is cell biologist Michael Overholtzer. The founding dean, serving for over a decade, was molecular biologist Ken Marians.

The Tri-Institutional MD–PhD Program is a partnership of MSKCC, Weill Cornell Medicine, and The Rockefeller University. The dual degree program takes advantage of the close proximity of these three institutions for collaboration on biomedical research and medical training. MSKCC also has an academic partnership with Weill Cornell Medicine known as the Weill Cornell Graduate School of Medical Sciences.

Notable faculty

Presidents
 Selwyn M. Vickers, 2022–
 Craig B. Thompson, 2010–2022
 Harold Varmus, 2000–2010
 Paul A. Marks, 1980–1999
 Lewis Thomas, 1973–1980
 David Walsh, 1971–1973
 Richard D. Vanderwarker, 1962–1971
 John R. Heller, 1960–1961

Others

 James P. Allison
 Kathryn V. Anderson
 Murray Brennan
  Carol L. Brown
 Samuel Danishefsky 
 Nori Dattatreyudu
 Lisa DeAngelis
 Jeffrey Drebin
 Jimmie C. Holland
 Maria Jasin
 David Kissane
 Iris Long
 Scott W. Lowe
 Joan Massagué
 Kenneth Offit
 Lloyd Old
 Nikola P. Pavletich
 Mark S. Ptashne
 James Rothman
 Alexander Rudensky
 Valerie Rusch
 Charles Sawyers
 Lorenz Studer

Reputation
In 2015 Charity Watch rated Memorial Sloan Kettering Cancer Center an "A". Heads of the charity received $2,107,939 to $2,639,669 salary/compensation from the charity. CEO Craig B. Thompson received $2,554,085 salary/compensation from the charity.

See also
Weill Cornell Graduate School of Medical Sciences
Tri-Institutional MD–PhD Program
National Comprehensive Cancer Network
MD Anderson Cancer Center

References

External links

 
Hospitals established in 1884
Buildings and structures completed in 1973
Cancer hospitals
Hospitals in Manhattan
Institutions founded by the Rockefeller family
Universities and colleges in Manhattan
Charles F. Kettering
Upper East Side
Medical research institutes in New York (state)
NCI-designated cancer centers
1884 establishments in New York (state)